"My Head's In Mississippi" is a song by ZZ Top from their album Recycler. The song was produced by band manager Bill Ham, and recorded and mixed by Terry Manning. In December 1990, the song reached number one on the Billboard Album Rock Tracks chart and number 166 in Australia.

Composition
In 2015, Gibbons said of the song "My buddy Walter Baldwin spoke in the most poetic way. Every sentence was a visual awakening. His dad was the editor of the Houston Post. We grew up in a neighborhood where the last thing you would say is, 'These teenagers know what blues is.' But our appreciation dragged us in.
Years later, we were sitting in a tavern in Memphis called Sleep Out Louie's — you could see the Mississippi River. Walter said, 'We didn't grow up pickin' cotton. We weren't field hands in Mississippi. But my head's there.' Our platform, in ZZ Top, was we'd be the Salvador Dalí of the Delta. It was a surrealist take. This song was not a big radio hit. But we still play it live, even if it's just the opening bit."

In 2008, Gibbons stated, "'My Head’s in Mississippi,' which was one of the first completed tracks on the album, is a great example of how we mixed the new with the old. Initially, it was a straight-ahead boogie-woogie. Then Frank stepped in and threw in those highly gated electronic drum fills, which modernized the track."

Track listing
"My Head's In Mississippi"
"A Fool For Your Stockings"

Album appearances
In addition to Recycler, "My Head's in Mississippi" appears on the following compilations:
 One Foot in the Blues
 Greatest Hits
 Rancho Texicano
 Chrome, Smoke & BBQ

Personnel
Billy Gibbons – guitar, vocals
Dusty Hill – bass
Frank Beard – drums

References

1990 songs
1990 singles
ZZ Top songs
Songs written by Frank Beard (musician)
Songs written by Dusty Hill
Songs written by Billy Gibbons
Song recordings produced by Bill Ham